Qatar Gaz (also Romanized as Qaţār Gaz) is a village in Golestan Rural District, in the Central District of Sirjan County, Kerman Province, Iran. At the 2006 census, its population was 52, in 16 families.

References 

Populated places in Sirjan County